Jack Lambert may refer to:

Jack Lambert (British actor) (1899–1976), British actor
Jack Lambert (footballer, born 1902) (1902–1940), English footballer
Jack Walter Lambert (1917–1986), English arts journalist, editor and broadcaster
Jack Lambert (American actor) (1920–2002), American actor
Jack Lambert (American football) (born 1952), American football player
Jack Lambert (footballer, born 1999), English footballer

See also
John Lambert (disambiguation)